The men's 3000 metres steeplechase event at the 1975 Pan American Games was held in Mexico City on 14 October.

Results

References

Athletics at the 1975 Pan American Games
1975